Michal Papadopulos (born 14 April 1985) is a Czech professional footballer who most recently played as a forward for Czech club MFK Karviná.

Career
Papadopulos started his football career in his native Ostrava at NH Ostrava, and then Baník Ostrava. He moved early to English club Arsenal in July 2003. He played one first-team match for Arsenal, in a League Cup match against Wolverhampton Wanderers as a substitute for Jérémie Aliadière. He returned to Baník in 2004. Papadopulos won the Czech Cup with Baník in 2005. In December 2005, he moved to German club Bayer Leverkusen, spending some time on loan at side Energie Cottbus before signing with Czech side Mladá Boleslav in June 2008. In June 2009, SC Heerenveen signed the Czech forward from Mladá Boleslav on a five-year contract.

Personal life
Papadopulos is of Greek and Czech descent

Honours
Piast Gliwice
Ekstraklasa: 2018–19

References

External links 
 
 
 
 
 
 

1985 births
Living people
Czech people of Greek descent
Sportspeople from Ostrava
Czech footballers
Association football forwards
Czech Republic international footballers
Czech Republic under-21 international footballers
Czech Republic youth international footballers
Czech First League players
Czech National Football League players
Bundesliga players
Eredivisie players
Russian Premier League players
Ekstraklasa players
FC Baník Ostrava players
FK Mladá Boleslav players
Arsenal F.C. players
Bayer 04 Leverkusen players
FC Energie Cottbus players
SC Heerenveen players
FC Rostov players
Zagłębie Lubin players
Piast Gliwice players
FC Zhemchuzhina Sochi players
Korona Kielce players
MFK Karviná players
Czech expatriate footballers
Czech expatriate sportspeople in England
Expatriate footballers in England
Czech expatriate sportspeople in Germany
Expatriate footballers in Germany
Czech expatriate sportspeople in the Netherlands
Expatriate footballers in the Netherlands
Czech expatriate sportspeople in Russia
Expatriate footballers in Russia
Czech expatriate sportspeople in Poland
Expatriate footballers in Poland